The cystic duct is the short duct that joins the gallbladder to the common hepatic duct. It usually lies next to the cystic artery.  It is of variable length.  It contains 'spiral valves of Heister', which do not provide much resistance to the flow of bile.

Function
Bile can flow in both directions between the gallbladder and the common bile duct and the hepatic duct.

In this way, bile is stored in the gallbladder in between meal times.  The hormone cholecystokinin, when stimulated by a fatty meal, promotes bile secretion by increased production of hepatic bile, contraction of the gall bladder, and relaxation of the Sphincter of Oddi.

Clinical significance
Gallstones can enter and obstruct the cystic duct, preventing the flow of bile. The increased pressure in the gallbladder leads to swelling and pain. This pain, known as biliary colic, is sometimes referred to as a gallbladder "attack" because of its sudden onset.

During a cholecystectomy, the cystic duct is clipped two or three times and a cut is made between the clips, freeing the gallbladder to be taken out.

See also
 Accessory bile duct

Additional images

References

External links
  - "The gallbladder and extrahepatic bile ducts."
  - "Stomach, Spleen and Liver: The Gallbladder and the Bile System"
 

Digestive system
Hepatology
Gallbladder